Benin-Ore-Sagamu Expressway is a 492 km stretch dual-lane connecting Benin City to Ore town in Ondo State and Sagamu in Ogun State. It's a major route from the Southern part of the country to the South Western, and Northern parts of Nigeria through the Benin-Auchi axis.

Construction 
The Benin to Lagos highway was the first conceived and constructed Federal Trunk  'A' road between 1962 and 1963 in Nigeria. It was later awarded to Dumez Construction Company at the cost of 229.5 million naira for reconstruction and dualization and was commissioned in 1981.

Technical Analysis

2 x dual lanes expressway – 2 x 262

20,000,000 m3 of earthworks,

4,000,000 m2 of crushed rock and soil cement

base, hot rolled asphalt pavement,

10,000 m2 of bridge decking (dual 24′ wide

carriageway) concrete median barrier.

Sagamu-Benin Expressway is part of the Lagos-Mombasa, as well as Algiers-Lagos sections of the Trans-Africa Highway, and Nigeria's East-West Road, making it one of the most important road networks in Nigeria.

References 

Expressways